Leporinus melanopleura is a species of Leporinus widely found in the Amazon River basin in South America. This species can reach a length of  SL.

References

Garavello, J.C. and H.A. Britski, 2003. Anostomidae (Headstanders). p. 71-84. In R.E. Reis, S.O. Kullander and C.J. Ferraris, Jr. (eds.) Checklist of the Freshwater Fishes of South and Central America. Porto Alegre: EDIPUCRS, Brasil.

Taxa named by Albert Günther
Taxa described in 1864
Fish described in 1864
Anostomidae